Flippomusic is a contemporary jazz ensemble based in Chicago, Illinois, which was formed in 1992 by pianist Dave Flippo to perform his compositions and arrangements. Members Dan Hesler (saxophone and flute), Donn De Santo (bass), Heath Chappell (drums), and Aras Biskis (percussion).

History

1992-1994 - Tendrils of Light 
Flippomusic gave its first performance at At The Tracks in Chicago and continued performing at area clubs, including the Bop Shop, Jazz Bulls, the Hothouse, Morseland, the Underground Wonderbar, and the Heartland Cafe. The original members of the band included Dave Flippo (keyboards), Dan Hesler (saxophone), Steve Hashimoto (electric bass), Steve Strunk (drums) and John McLean (guitar).The instrumentation was reconfigured in 1993 and the guitar position was replaced by Hamid Drake on percussion with Aras Biskis taking over the drum chair. The band recorded its first CD, Tendril of Light, on the Southport label in 1994 and also won first place in Winterbreak-Cruise to Chicago contest, a City of Chicago-sponsored event which won them a booking at the Taste of Chicago in the same year. Guest artists on Tendrils of Light include Michael Zerang and Ken Gueno on percussion and Donn De Santo on bass.

1994-2001 - Ganesh 
The band added additional Flippo compositions as well as works by Steve Hashimoto, Dan Hesler and several modern jazz standards to their repertoire and began performing at area colleges, festivals and special events at area museums and art galleries. During the period the instrumentation crystallized into its present form - with Dave Flippo on keys, Dan Hesler on saxes and flute, Donn De Santo on bass, Heath Chappell on drums and Aras Biskis now on percussion. The ensemble released their second CD, Ganesh, in 2001, also on Southport Records. The ensemble tracks were recorded at Donn DeSanto's "Bassplace Productions" studio while the solo piano preludes recorded at Sparrow Sound Design (Southport Records). Guest artists on the recording included Lyon Leifer on bansuri and Yatindra Vaid on tablas.

2001-2005 - When the Heart is Strong the Voice Rings True 
Shortly after the release of Ganesh, De Santo and Flippo formed a duo and began mixing in new vocal compositions and arrangements of Flippo with jazz standards. For a time it was called Da Duo De Flippo De Santo, but later was considered part of Flippomusic. The larger quintet continued to perform during this period. The band's third release came in 2005 with a primarily duo recording, When the Heart is Strong, the Voice Rings True. The duo was augmented on several tracks by Dan Hesler on saxophones, Leo Murphy on drums and Michael Levin on clarinet.

2005 to present - Tao Tunes 
During the recording of When the Heart is Strong ..., Flippo completed the Writer's Workshop Program at the Theatre Building Chicago where he composed two full length musicals and studied techniques for setting lyrics to music. Once he complete this course, he resurrected a project he has begun in 2004, the creation of a set of modern vocal jazz pieces that set various chapters of the Tao Te Ching – Tao Tunes. After first creating adapted lyrics from various English translations in the public domain, Flippo composed eighteen pieces and completed the set in 2009. Recording began in March 2010, Tao Tunes was completed in June, 2011 and released November 2011. Guest artists include Larry Gray (cello), Neal Alger (guitar), Hamid Drake (percussion), Mike Levin (Bb and bass clarinet and flute) and Katherine Hughes (violin).

After the recording of Tao Tunes, Flippomusic expanded its program to include music from all four CD's—the "globaljazz" compositions, the vocal duo pieces and the set of Tao Tunes. The band offered programs which were purely "globaljazz" but also one which mixed the earlier material with the new vocal compositions.

Performances 
 1994 – Taste of Chicago
 1994 – DePaul University Multicultural Festival
 1994/1996 – Around The Coyote Art Festival
 1994 – Chicago Cultural Center – live broadcast on WFMT
 1995 – Independent Label Festival
 1996 – Chicago Symphony Orchestra "East Meets West Festival"
 1996 – Southport Jazz Festival (at the Bop Shop)
 1994 – University of Chicago Jazz Festival
 1997 – Oakbrook Summer Concert Series
 1998, 2005 – Condordia College Artist Series
 1998 – Navy Pier "World Jazz Festival"
 1998 – "After Hours" at the Art Institute of Chicago
 1999 – "Jazzin' at the Shed" – Shed Aquarium
 2000 – Southshore Jazz Festival
 2003 – Skokie Festival of Cultures
 2004 – Brookfield Zoo Concert Series
 2004 – College of Lake County Artist Series
 2004 – Northwestern University "Lunch on the Lake" Series
 2009 – Evanston Ethnic Arts Festival
 2010, 2008, 2007, 2002, 2001, 2000 – Buffalo, Grove Summer Concert Series.
 Summer Fests: Buffalo Grove "Concerts on the Rotary Green" ('93, '94,) Libertyville "Out to Lunch" Series (1995), "Lunch by the Lake" – Northwestern University

Discography 
 Tendrils of Light (Southport, 1994)
 Ganes  (Southport, 2001)
 When the Heart is Strong, the Voice Rings True (Oppilf, 2004)
 Tao Tunes  (Oppilf, 2011)

Guests and former band members 
 John McLean – guitar
 Mike Smith – guitar
 Paul Mertens – saxophones and flute
 Pat Mallanger – saxophones
 Ken Vandermark – saxophones
 John Boes – saxophones and flute
 Cameron Pfiffner – saxophones
 Jim Gailloreto – saxophones
 Michael Levin – saxophones and flute
 Winston Damen (Stone) – percussion
 Steve Magnome – drums
 Hamid Drake – percussion
 Lewis Ewerling – drums and percussion
 Bob Garrett – percussion
 Michael Zerang – percussion
 Ken Gueno – percussion
 Kurt Loeffler – drums
 Jim Widlowski – drums
 Ted Sirota – drums
 Alejandro Cimadoro – bass
 Mike Fiorino – bass
 Chris Clementi – bass

References

American jazz ensembles from Illinois